The 23rd annual Berlin International Film Festival was held from 22 June to 3 July 1973. The Golden Bear was awarded to the Indian film Ashani Sanket by Satyajit Ray.

Jury
The following people were announced as being on the jury for the festival:
 David Robinson, writer and film critic (United Kingdom) - Jury President
 Freddy Buache, journalist and film historian (Switzerland)
 Hiram García Borja, director of the Banco Nacional Cinematrográfico (Mexico)
 Eberhard Hauff, director and screenwriter (West Germany)
 Harish Khanna, director of the International Film Festival of India (India)
 Paul Moor,  journalist and writer (United States)
 Walter Müller-Bringmann, journalist and film critic (West Germany)
 René Thévenet, producer (France)
 Paolo Valmarana, journalist and film critic (Italy)

Films in competition
The following films were in competition for the Golden Bear award:

Out of competition
 Duel, directed by Steven Spielberg (USA)
 Emperor of the North Pole, directed by Robert Aldrich (USA)

Key
{| class="wikitable" width="550" colspan="1"
| style="background:#FFDEAD;" align="center"| †
|Winner of the main award for best film in its section
|}

Awards
The following prizes were awarded by the Jury:
 Golden Bear: Ashani Sanket by Satyajit Ray
 Silver Bear – Special Jury Prize: There's No Smoke Without Fire by André Cayatte
 Silver Bear:
 The 14 by David Hemmings
 Toda Nudez Será Castigada by Arnaldo Jabor
 Die Sachverständigen by Norbert Kückelmann
 Le Grand Blond avec une chaussure noire by Yves Robert
 Los siete locos by Leopoldo Torre Nilsson
FIPRESCI Award
Wedding in Blood by Claude Chabrol

References

External links
23rd Berlin International Film Festival 1973
1973 Berlin International Film Festival
Berlin International Film Festival:1973 at Internet Movie Database

23
1973 film festivals
1973 in West Germany
1970s in West Berlin